The 1985 USL season was the United Soccer League's second and final season. The season was abruptly canceled after the pre-season League Cup and one regular season game.

History
The United Soccer League played its first season in 1984 as the de facto United States second division.  The previous second division, the American Soccer League, had collapsed in 1983 and the United Soccer League intended to establish itself as a fiscally sound replacement for the failed league.  The USL played the 1984 season with nine teams in three divisions.  In February 1985, the North American Soccer League and USL began negotiations to merge the two leagues.  On March 5, USL President William Burfeind announced the merger would not take place.  The NASL collapsed soon afterwards, along with six of the USL franchises.  The Oklahoma City Stampede moved to Tulsa and became the Tulsa Tornados and the league added the El Paso/Juarez Gamecocks.  The season was scheduled to run from May 19 through August 24.  By mid-May, league officials had extensively revamped the schedule.  They decided to hold a six-game "cup" schedule beginning at the end of May.  The top two teams would then play for the cup title.  After a short break, the league planned to continue with a twelve-game regular season.  This would allow the league to expand the number of teams.  Burfeind resigned as league president and Kalman Csapo replaced him.  By the end of the six game cup schedule, the league and teams were bankrupt and failed to complete the championship between the two top teams, the South Florida Sun and the Dallas Americans.  The league announced the Sun, who had the best record, were cup champions.

Within days El Paso/Juarez owner, Pedro Meneses, announced that he was dropping out of the league. He paid all debts through the end of June and released his players. Only the thin possibility of a new ownership group taking over the Gamecocks tenuously kept the team in the league. At the same time Dallas had to grant its players a stock participation program and pay back-salaries to keep their team afloat.

Final USL match
In what should have been the start of the 1985 USL regular season, the Sun rallied to defeat Dallas, 3–1, on Saturday, June 22, 1985 at Lockhart Stadium in Fort Lauderdale, Florida. Instead, it turned out to be the USL's swan song. Tulsa players had refused to play their match later that night against the Gamecocks, because they had not been paid in six weeks, and issues had also arisen with the Tornados' stadium lease. South Florida were scheduled to host El Paso/Juarez on June 26. Instead on the evening of June 25, the league voted to suspend the remainder of the season.

Even after the league folded team officials from the Sun tried in vain to carry on as an independent squad by staging exhibitions matches. It was also a last ditch effort to offset their payroll debt. In the end only one match, versus the Haiti national football team, ever materialized. The Sun rallied to win what was to be the final game involving a USL squad, 4–3, on July 4, 1985 before a Lockhart Stadium crowd of 3,529. The match's proceeds were divvied up among the players.

League Cup
The league cup was a last minute creation. The United Soccer League had intended to run a twenty-game regular season but when only four teams committed to the season, the league decided to run a six-game cup schedule.  This would give league officials time to find more teams for the later eighteen game regular season.  Initially, the league intended to have the top two teams in the cup compete in a two-game, home and away series to determine the champion.  Because of financial issues, Tulsa failed to show up for a game at Dallas, and the match was subsequently forfeited. In the end, the league staged only the six games per team, announcing that the South Florida Sun had won the cup. As a harbinger of what was to come, no actual cup was presented to the team, causing Sun player-coach, Keith Weller, to quip at the time, "There ain't no cup." Ten days later the league folded.

Table

Scoring leaders

Goalkeeping leaders

References

External links
United Soccer League (RSSSF)

United Soccer League (1984–85) seasons
2
Soccer in Florida